The Caruthersville Pilots were a minor league baseball team located in Caruthersville, Missouri. The Pilots played as exclusively members of the Class D level Northeast Arkansas League from 1936 to 1940 after a Caruthersville team had played in the 1910 league. Caruthersville won league championships in 1910, 1936 and 1939. For their duration, the Caruthersville Pilots were a minor league affiliate of the St. Louis Cardinals and hosted home games at the American Legion Park.

History
Minor league baseball first came to Caruthersville, Missouri when the 1910 Caruthersville team became members of the Class D level Northeast Arkansas League. Playing in the four–team league under manager Al Ritter, Caruthersville finished with a 68–48 overall record, best in the league and won the first–half title in the league. The 1910 team was possibly called the "Alfalfas."

At the end of the 1910 season, the playoff series between Caruthersville and the Paragould Scouts was tied at 2–games each, when the final game was cancelled after a "riot" broke out during the game.

After a decades long hiatus, minor league baseball returned in 1936, when Caruthersville again became a franchise in the reformed Class D level Northeast Arkansas League during the season. On June 11, 1936, the West Plains Badgers franchise moved to Caruthersville with an 18–10 record and became the "Caruthersville Pilots." Caruthersville became an affiliate of the St. Louis Cardinals, a partnership that continued for the duration of the franchise. Playing in two cities, the West Plains/Caruthersville team won the 1936 league title, playing the season under the direction of manager Harrison Wickel. The Pilots ended the regular season with a 51–48 record, placing 4th in the standings. In the playoffs, the Pilots defeated the Jonesboro Giants 2 games to 1, playing for the first half title. In the Finals, the Pilots defeated the Newport Cardinals 3 games to 2 to claim the 1936 Northeast Arkansas League championship.

Continuing play in the 1937 Northeast Arkansas League, Caruthersville finished in 2nd place overall. The Pilots finished the season with a 59–47 record under returning manager Harrison Wickel. Caruthersville finished behind the 1st place Blytheville Giants, who won both halves of the season standings, so no playoffs were held.

In 1938, Caruthersville finished in 2nd place in the Northeast Arkansas League standings with a 62–42 record. The Pilots' managers were Wilson Koewing, Al Iezzi and Joseph Simmons. In the 1938 playoffs, the Newport Cardinals defeated the Caruthersville Pilots 2 games to 1.

In 1939, the Caruthersville Pilots won the Northeast Arkansas League championship. With a regular season of 79–39, the Pilots placed 1st in the standings under returning manager Joseph Simmons, winning both half–season titles, so no playoff was held.

The Caruthersville Pilots played their final season in 1940, relocating during the season. In a partial season, the Caruthersville franchise moved to become the Batesville Pilots on July 10, 1940, with a 31–32 record at the time of the move. The team finished the season with an overall record of 47–73 , placing last in the four–team Northeast Arkansas League under manager Ernie Stefani.

Caruthersville, Missouri has not hosted another minor league team.

The ballpark
Beginning in 1936, the Caruthersville Pilots were noted to have played minor league home games at the American Legion Park. The field had dimensions of (left–center–right) 357–351–337 in 1939 and 350–351–350 in 1940.

Timeline

Year–by–year records

Notable alumni

Fats Dantonio (1939)
Whitey Kurowski (1937)
Hank Robinson (1910)
Tom Turner (1936–1937)
Harrison Wickel (1936–1937, MGR)

See also
Caruthersville Pilots playersCaruthersville (minor league baseball) players

References

External links
 Baseball Reference

Defunct baseball teams in Missouri
St. Louis Cardinals minor league affiliates
Baseball teams disestablished in 1940
Baseball teams established in 1936
Pemiscot County, Missouri
Northeast Arkansas League teams